Furci Siculo (Sicilian: Furci Sìculu) is a comune (municipality) in the Metropolitan City of Messina in the Italian region Sicily, located about  east of Palermo and about  southwest of Messina. Furci Siculo is twinned with Octeville sur Mer since 2010.

Furci Siculo borders the following municipalities: Casalvecchio Siculo, Pagliara, Roccalumera, Santa Lucia del Mela, Santa Teresa di Riva, Savoca.

References

Cities and towns in Sicily